Zelma Bogue (1880-1975) was an American politician from California. Bogue was the first female mayor of Glendale, California.

Early life 
In 1880, Bogue was born in Veedersburg, Indiana. Bogue's father was a building contractor.

Career 
Bogue started her career designing, building, and selling homes in Glendale, California.

In 1953, Bogue won the election and became a member of city council for Glendale, California. Bogue was the first woman elected to the city council. In 1957, as incumbent, Bogue was re-elected as a member of city council for Glendale, California. In April 1957, Bogue became the first woman mayor of Glendale, California, until April 1959. Bogue served as a member of the city council in Glendale, California until 1965.

Personal life 
Vogue's husband was J. Livingston Bogue. In 1926, Bogue and her husband moved to Glendale, California. They had two daughters, Neva and Olivetta.

In July 1975, Bogue died at Glendale Adventist Hospital in Glendale, California. She was 94 years old.

References

External links 
 Zelma Bogue at twitter.com
 Zelma Bogue in Glendale, 1940-2000 By Juliet M. Arroyo
 Image of Zelma Bogue 1959
 Glendale Area History, By E. Caswell Perry, Zelma Bogue on page 199
 Women, with the exception of Monterey Park Mayor Leila Donegan, shy away from political races

1975 deaths
Mayors of Glendale, California
Women mayors of places in California
1880 births
20th-century American politicians
20th-century American women politicians
California city council members
Women city councillors in California
People from Fountain County, Indiana